Keith Weller Taylor (born 1946) is an American sinologist, historian and writer noted for his expertise on Vietnamese history and Vietnamese literature. He currently is Professor of Sino-Vietnamese Cultural Studies in the Department of Asian Studies at Cornell University. Unlike most Western Vietnam historians, who write primarily about the 20th century and, in particular, about the US intervention, Taylor's research focuses mostly on pre-colonial Vietnamese history before the 20th century. He is now considered one of the pioneer experts in this field. He fought in Vietnam as a soldier in the United States Army, and subsequently has visited Vietnam for research and scholarly exchange many times and lived continuously in Vietnam for two years in the early 1990s while studying and teaching. He has researched all periods of the Vietnamese past and has developed a particular interest in Vietnamese poetry and how it has changed from generation to generation. In 2015 he received the Phan Châu Trinh Cultural Foundation Prize for Vietnamese Studies in Ho Chi Minh City.

Publications

 (co-author with John K. Whitmore).
 (edited by Taylor and Olga Dror)

See also

Victor Lieberman
Christopher Goscha
David Chandler

References
Footnotes

External links
 Curriculum vitae

1946 births
20th-century American historians
American male non-fiction writers
21st-century American historians
21st-century American male writers
American anti–Vietnam War activists
American sinologists
Cornell University faculty
Living people
People from Michigan
Vietnamologists
United States Army personnel of the Vietnam War
20th-century American male writers